Gerald William Reynolds (17 July 1927 – 7 June 1969), known as Gerry Reynolds, was a British Labour Party politician.

Political career
Reynolds was elected as the Member of Parliament for the constituency of Islington North in a 1958 by-election following the early death of the sitting MP Wilfred Fienburgh, who was killed in a car crash at the age of 38. He was re-elected the following year at the 1959 general election, and at the next two general elections in the constituency.

In the British Government of the 1960s he was Parliamentary Under-Secretary for the Army from 1964 to 1965, then for two years he was the Minister of Defence (Army). From 1967-1969 he held the office of Minister of Defence (Administration) at the Ministry of Defence.

Death
Reynolds died of stomach cancer after a short illness on 7 June 1969 in his 42nd year. At the time of his unexpected death he was considered to be a "rising star" in Parliament, and was being talked of as a potential future Prime Minister.

Publications
'The Night the Police Went on Strike', by Reynolds, G.W. & Judge, A. (Pub. Weidenfeld & Nicolson, London, 1968).

References

External links
 

1927 births
1969 deaths
Labour Party (UK) MPs for English constituencies
Members of the Privy Council of the United Kingdom
Ministers in the Wilson governments, 1964–1970
UK MPs 1955–1959
UK MPs 1959–1964
UK MPs 1964–1966
UK MPs 1966–1970
Deaths from stomach cancer